Tadjemout is a town and commune in Laghouat Province, Algeria. According to the 1998 census it has a population of 20,321.

References

Communes of Laghouat Province
Cities in Algeria
Algeria